This is a list of current prefects of counties of Croatia.

See also
 Croatian local elections

References

External links
 https://web.archive.org/web/20130607162456/http://www.izbori.hr/2013Lokalni/rezult/rezultati.html
 https://web.archive.org/web/20140413174306/http://www.izbori.hr/2013Lokalni/rezult/krug-2/rezultati.html

Prefects